Michael William Jordan (born 7 April 1986) is an English retired football goalkeeper born in Cheshunt, Hertfordshire. He made seven appearances in the Football League for Chesterfield, having started his career as a trainee at Arsenal. He is currently the goalkeeper coach of Boreham Wood.

Career

Club career
Jordan signed for Arsenal as a scholar in 2002, turning professional on 1 November 2004 after making impressive performances for the youth team. However, he never played for the Arsenal first team; the closest he came was appearing on the bench for a League Cup match on 9 November 2004 against Everton, a match Arsenal won 3–1.

After trials at Doncaster Rovers, and AFC Bournemouth, Jordan signed for Yeovil Town on 9 March 2006 on a month's loan as goalkeeping cover during an injury crisis. The loan was later extended to the end of the season, at which time Yeovil declined to make the deal permanent and the player returned to Arsenal. On 30 June 2006, Arsenal released Jordan.

In July 2006, Jordan was invited for a week's trial at League One side Chesterfield by manager Roy McFarland. The trial became a permanent deal, with Jordan playing six times for Chesterfield in the following twelve months. At the end of the 2006–07 season, Jordan signed a contract for a further year, but on 7 March 2008 he left Chesterfield by mutual consent after learning he would not be offered a new contract at the end of the season. He subsequently signed for Conference South side Lewes, and helped them to the league title and automatic promotion to the Conference National.

Following a trial with Stevenage Borough, Jordan spent some weeks with the club but was released without playing for the first team. He joined fellow Conference National club Eastbourne Borough on 29 January 2009 to provide cover for their first-choice goalkeeper. On 5 February, Michael was released from his contract with the Conference club, later joining Southern Premier League team Farnborough. He appeared 64 times in competitive games for them (54 of them in the league), before moving on to join Conference South club Boreham Wood in the summer of 2011. The following summer he was signed by Concord Rangers of Isthmian League Premier Division.

International career
Jordan has represented England at under-17 and under-19 levels.

Coaching career
He joined Ebbsfleet United as the club's goalkeeping coach in the summer of 2016, and later registered as a player in case of emergencies. On 16 November 2018 the club announced, that Jordan had left the club.

On 1 March 2019 it was announced, that Jordan had returned to Boreham Wood, this time as a goalkeeper coach.

Honours
Arsenal
FA Youth Cup: 2000–01

References

External links

1986 births
Living people
People from Cheshunt
English footballers
Association football goalkeepers
Arsenal F.C. players
Yeovil Town F.C. players
Chesterfield F.C. players
Lewes F.C. players
Stevenage F.C. players
Eastbourne Borough F.C. players
Farnborough F.C. players
Boreham Wood F.C. players
Concord Rangers F.C. players
Ebbsfleet United F.C. players
English Football League players
National League (English football) players
Southern Football League players
Isthmian League players